Rob Abiamiri (born December 21, 1982 in Randallstown, Maryland) is an American football tight end who most recently played  for the Baltimore Ravens of the National Football League. Abiamiri was signed as an undrafted free agent by the Ravens after the 2005 NFL Draft following his career at Maryland. After being allocated to NFL Europa and spending the 2007 season as a member of the Berlin Thunder, Abiamiri was released by the Ravens on July 23, 2007 due to injuries and later decided to retire after not being signed by any other teams. Abiamiri attended Mount Saint Joseph High School in Baltimore, Maryland. Rob is the brother of Philadelphia Eagles defensive end, Victor Abiamiri and Paschal Abiamiri who also played football at the University of Maryland.

References

1982 births
Living people
American football tight ends
Maryland Terrapins football players
Baltimore Ravens players
Amsterdam Admirals players
People from Randallstown, Maryland
Players of American football from Maryland
American sportspeople of Nigerian descent